UTC Oxfordshire is a mixed University Technical College located in Harwell, Oxfordshire, England. It opened in 2015 and caters for students aged 14–19 years.

The UTC's sponsors are Activate Learning, the UK Atomic Energy Authority, RM, Mini, Royal Holloway University of London and the University of Reading.

References

External links 
 UTC Oxfordshire official site

Secondary schools in Oxfordshire
Educational institutions established in 2015
2015 establishments in England
University Technical Colleges